The men's 50 kilometres walk at the 2008 Summer Olympics took place on August 22 at the Beijing National Stadium.

The qualifying standards were 4:00:00 (A standard) and 4:07:00 (B standard).

Records
Prior to this competition, the existing world and Olympic records were as follows:

The following new Olympic record was set during this competition.

Results

OR - Olympic Record / PB - Personal Best / SB - Season Best / NR - National Record / DNF - Did Not Finish / DQ - Disqualified / DNS - Did Not Start

Intermediates

s.t. - same time.

References
sports-reference

Athletics at the 2008 Summer Olympics
Racewalking at the Olympics
Men's events at the 2008 Summer Olympics